Anjirestan may refer to:
 Anjirestan, Kerman
 Anjirestan, Izeh, Khuzestan Province